USCGC Sea Devil is the 68th  coastal patrol boat to be built, and the first of four to be paid for by the US Navy. It is operated by the U.S. Coast Guard.
Her home port is Naval Base Kitsap-Bangor in Silverdale, Washington, where she and her sister ship  are assigned to one of two Maritime Force Protection Units. Their sole mission is to escort the Navy's largest submarines, the nuclear-armed , while in and near their moorings in Puget Sound.  and  guard the submarine base in Kings Bay, Georgia, on the Atlantic Ocean.

These submarines require an escort because, while they carry some of the most powerful weapons ever built, they do not mount weapons suitable to protect them from surface threats, like the speedboat that carried a bomb that damaged .

Design

Sea Devil is slightly modified from the standard design of a Marine Protector cutter, the smallest cutter the Coast Guard currently has in service. They are all equipped with a (water)jet-propelled pursuit boat, that is deployed and retrieved via a stern launching ramp, enabling it to be used without bringing the cutter to a halt.

Sea Devil, and the three other vessels, have been modified from the design of the Coast Guard's other Marine Protector cutters. These four vessels mount an additional gyro-stabilized remotely controlled machine gun.  The main armament of the standard Marine Protector cutter are a pair of .50-caliber (12.7mm) Browning machine guns, mounted on the rail to either side of the vessel's foredeck.  The long range accuracy of these weapons is low, when fired by a gunner on a pitching deck, aiming using "iron sights". Sea Devil, and the three other cutters, have a pedestal, in the middle of the foredeck, that gives their main armament a better field of fire.  The gun mounted on the pedestal is the same Browning as the other guns, but gyro stabilization compensates for the pitching deck.  The mount is equipped with multiple cameras, enabling the gun aimer on the bridge to focus the gun's sights on a distant target, even at night, or when visibility is impaired by smoke, or fog.

To complete their missions these four ships carry a larger crew. Where a standard Marine Protector cutter deploys with a crew of ten, these vessels deploy with a crew of fifteen.

References

External links
 

Ships of the United States Coast Guard
Patrol vessels of the United States
Marine Protector-class coastal patrol boats
Seattle
Ships built in Lockport, Louisiana
2008 ships